Jamir Jones (born June 14, 1998) is an American football outside linebacker for the Pittsburgh Steelers of the National Football League (NFL). He played college football at Notre Dame.

College career
Jones played four years at Notre Dame, appearing in 55 games during his four seasons. As a senior in 2019, he played in 11 games and finished with 50 tackles, seven and a half for a loss, and four and a half sacks. He also forced two fumbles and recovered another.

Professional career

Houston Texans
On April 30, 2020, Jones was signed by the Houston Texans as an undrafted free agent and was waived on July 28.

Pittsburgh Steelers
On April 7, 2021, Jones signed with the Pittsburgh Steelers after catching Mike Tomlin and Kevin Colbert's attention in Notre Dame's 2021 Pro Day. Through training camp, he turned heads with his consistent motor and hustle and by regularly winning his one on one confrontations during drills and scrimmages. In preseason, he continued his strong play with four QB sacks in four games and by leading the NFL with six QB hits and thirteen total QB pressures while also leading the Steelers with six special teams tackles, earning a place in the 53-man roster. He was waived on September 28, 2021.

Los Angeles Rams
On September 29, 2021, Jones was claimed off waivers by the Los Angeles Rams. He was waived on December 25.

Jacksonville Jaguars
On December 27, 2021 Jones was claimed off waivers by the Jacksonville Jaguars. He was waived on August 31, 2022.

Pittsburgh Steelers (second stint)
On September 1, 2022, Jones was claimed off waivers by the Steelers.

References

External links
Notre Dame Fighting Irish bio

1998 births
Living people
American football linebackers
Houston Texans players
Jacksonville Jaguars players
Los Angeles Rams players
Notre Dame Fighting Irish football players
People from Rochester, New York
Pittsburgh Steelers players
Sportspeople from Rochester, New York
Players of American football from New York (state)